Jeong Nan-jeong (1525(?) - November 13, 1565) was a Korean de facto politician of the Joseon period.

Biography 
Lady Jeong was born in Hanseong into the Chogye Jeong clan to Jeong Yun-gyeom, a deputy general, and his concubine, Lady Nam. She was the illegitimate daughter among her father’s two sons and three daughters. Lady Jeong’s mother was a slave because she was involved in treason, and was eventually assigned to the house of Jeong Yun-gyeom.

When she was young, she fell in love with Yun Won-hyeong, the younger brother of Queen Munjeong, and became a concubine. Lady Jeong soon became the influential concubine of Yun Won-hyeong, who himself was the maternal uncle of 13th King Myeongjong, and Chief State Councilor during 1563 to 1565. 

Later, when Kim Ahn-ro's conspiracy to dethrone Queen Munjeong was discovered, Kim Ahn-ro was investigated and she poisoned Kim Ahn-ro's first cousin once removed, Yun Won-hyeong's first wife, Lady Kim of the Yeonan Kim clan. After that, in the 8th year of King Myeongjong's reign, Queen Munjeong had made it a priority to make Jeong Nan-jeong her sister-in-law.

She soon became the second wife with full status. She became very close to her sister-in-law Queen Munjeong, and gained a good amount of wealth. But because she was the second wife, the children of Lady Kim inherited the wealth of the clan rather than her own.

In 1565, after the death of the Queen, both Jeong and Yun were exiled from the capital and, unable to make a political comeback, both committed suicide by poison (Jeong first, followed by her husband)

Family
Father - Jeong Yun-gyeom (정윤겸, 鄭允謙) (1463 - 1536)
 Grandfather - Jeong On (정온, 鄭溫)
Mother - Lady Nam (남씨, 南氏)
Husband - Yun Won-hyeong (윤원형, 尹元衡) (1503 - 18 November 1565)
 Issue
Daughter - Lady Yun of the Papyeong Yun clan (파평 윤씨)
 Son-in-law - Yi Jo-min (이조민, 李肇敏)

In fiction
 Portrayed by Kang Soo-Yeon in the 2001 SBS TV Series Ladies in the Palace.
 Portrayed by Park Joo-mi in the 2016 MBC TV series The Flower in Prison.
 Portrayed by Yoon Ji-min in the 2019 TV Chosun TV series Joseon Survival Period.

See also 
 Eulsa literati purge
 Jungjong of Joseon

References

External links 
 Naver: Jeong Nan-jeong  
 Encykorea: Jeong Nan-jeong: Korean historical person information  

 Nate: Jeong Nan-jeong 

Korean politicians
Joseon Buddhists
16th-century Korean people
1565 deaths
16th-century Korean women